Abla Bensenouci (born 22 December 2000) is an Algerian footballer who plays as a midfielder for Saudi club Al Ahli SFC and the Algeria national team.

Club career
Bensenouci started playing football with AS Intissar Oran in her hometown of Oran. In 2021, she joined FC Constantine (now CS Constantine) and Al Ahli SFC of the Saudi Women's Premier League in 2022.

International career
In 2019, Bensenouci represented the Algeria U-20 national team in the 2019 UNAF U-20 Women's Tournament.

In 2021, Bensenouci joined the senior Algeria women's national football team and took part in the 2021 Arab Women's Cup.

References

2000 births
Living people
Footballers from Oran
Algerian women's footballers
Women's association football midfielders
Algeria women's international footballers
Algerian expatriate footballers
Algerian expatriate sportspeople in Saudi Arabia
Expatriate women's footballers in Saudi Arabia
21st-century Algerian people
Saudi Women's Premier League players